Franklin Avenue station is a light rail station on the Blue Line in Minneapolis, Minnesota.

This station is a bridge above Franklin Avenue along Minnesota State Highway 55, in Minneapolis. This is a center-platform station. Along with the Lake Street station, Franklin Avenue is one of the two above-grade stations on the Blue Line. The station is home to the marquee of the New Franklin theater, located nearby. Service began at this station when the Blue Line opened on June 26, 2004.

The maintenance base of the line is just to the north, between this stop and Cedar-Riverside. When train operators begin and end their shifts, they used to make an extra stop there to take on the new driver. The driver now boards and departs the train at Franklin Avenue Station.

Bus connections
From Franklin Avenue Station, there is a direct connection to routes 2, 9, and 67. Route 22 stops just a block away.

Notable places nearby
East Phillips Park
Hiawatha LRT Trail
Little Earth Trail
Phillips neighborhood
Seward neighborhood
Ventura Village neighborhood

References

External links 
Metro Transit: Franklin Avenue Station

Metro Blue Line (Minnesota) stations in Minneapolis
Railway stations in the United States opened in 2004
2004 establishments in Minnesota